Jojoba wax esters are polyethylene glycol derivatives of the acids and alcohols obtained from the saponification of jojoba oil.  With an average ethoxylation value of 80, it is known as jojoba wax PEG-80 esters or PEG-80 jojoba.  With an average ethoxylation value of 120, it is known as jojoba wax PEG-120 esters or PEG-120 jojoba. Jojoba wax esters are used in cosmetic formulations as emollients.

References

Cosmetics chemicals